Alice Pol (born 3 December 1982) is a French actress. She is known for playing the role of Anna Zvenka in Supercondriaque.

Filmography

References

External links

 
 Allociné

1982 births
Living people
21st-century French actresses
French film actresses
French television actresses
People from Réunion